Future Shock is the fourth studio album by the British hard rock band Gillan. Released by Virgin in 1981, it reached number 2 in the UK album chart; this would remain the band's highest placing.

The title is taken from Alvin Toffler's book Future Shock.

The original vinyl LP had a gatefold sleeve, with centre pages. Cover painting is by Alan Daniels for Young Artists.

Reception

In 2005, Future Shock was ranked number 467 in the German Rock Hard magazine's book of The 500 Greatest Rock & Metal Albums of All Time.

Track listing
Side one
"Future Shock" (Ian Gillan, John McCoy, Bernie Tormé) – 3:06
"Night Ride Out of Phoenix" (Gillan, Colin Towns) – 5:06 
"(The Ballad Of) The Lucitania Express" (Gillan, McCoy, Tormé) – 3:10
"No Laughing in Heaven" (Gillan, McCoy, Tormé, Towns, Mick Underwood) – 4:58 
"Sacre Bleu" (Gillan, McCoy, Tormé) – 3:03
"New Orleans" (Frank Guida, Joseph Royster) – 2:37  (Gary U.S. Bonds cover)

Side two
"Bite the Bullet" (Gillan, Towns) – 4:50 
"If I Sing Softly" (Gillan, McCoy, Tormé) – 6:10
"Don't Want the Truth" (Gillan, McCoy, Tormé) – 5:40
"For Your Dreams" (Gillan, Towns) – 5:04

1989 re-release bonus tracks
In 1989 the album was re-released in CD format again on the Virgin label. The revised track listing featured several bonus tracks:

"One for the Road" (Gillan, Towns) – 3:03
 "Bad News" (Gillan, McCoy, Tormé, Underwood) – 3:08 
 "Take a Hold of Yourself" (Gillan, McCoy, Towns, Underwood) – 4:42 
 "Mutually Assured Destruction (M.A.D.)" (Gillan, McCoy, Tormé, Towns, Underwood) – 3:13 
 "The Maelström (Longer Than the A Side)" (Gillan, McCoy, Tormé, Towns, Underwood) – 5:07
 "Trouble" (Leiber, Stoller) – 2:39 
 "Your Sister's on My List" (Gillan, Towns) – 4:07
 "Handles on Her Hips" (Gillan, McCoy, Tormé) – 2:10
 "Higher and Higher" (Gillan, McCoy, Tormé) – 3:42
 "I Might As Well Go Home (Mystic)" (Gillan, Towns) – 2:16

2007 re-release bonus tracks
In 2007 the album was re-released in CD format again on the Edsel label. This has retrospective comments by Ian Gillan and the original artwork, plus pictures of various single picture sleeves. The revised track listing, similar to the 1989 release, had the following bonus tracks:

"Trouble" – 2:40
 "Your Sister's on My List" – 4:07
 "Mutually Assured Destruction" – 3:13
 "The Maelström (Longer Than the A Side)" – 5:16
 "Take a Hold of Yourself" – 4:42
 "One for the Road" – 3:02
 "Lucille" (Richard Wayne Penniman, Albert Collins) – 2:39
 "Bad News" – 3:06

Other notable re-releases
In August 2012 a new collectors edition of the album was released on vinyl. The release was produced as a 12-inch hardback book, with all the lyrics, images, photos and art from the original. The records themselves are housed in black holders within the book, each in a special bag with sleeve notes detailing the story of the album. The discs were pressed at 45 rpm for clarity of sound. This edition was limited to just 1,000 copies.

Personnel
Gillan
 Ian Gillan – lead vocals
 Bernie Tormé – guitar
 Colin Towns – keyboards
 John McCoy – bass
 Mick Underwood – drums

Production notes
 Recorded and mixed at Kingsway Recorders, London, January 1981
 Produced by K.R.
 Engineered by Paul Watkins
 Mixed by Paul Watkins, John McCoy with contributions from Colin Towns, Bernie Tormé and Mick Underwood

Charts

Album

Singles
New Orleans

No Laughing in Heaven

Certifications

References

External links
Ian Gillan's website
The Ian Gillan Discobiography (The Highway Star)
Edsel Records feature about Gillan's Future Shock

1981 albums
Gillan (band) albums
Virgin Records albums